TVNZ Duke, formerly Duke and stylized as TVNZ DUKE or DUKE, is a New Zealand television channel run by state broadcaster Television New Zealand. It screens programming targeted at a male audience. It was launched on 20 March 2016 to replace TVNZ's popup channel that was used to air the Wimbledon Championships. Initially advertised as a male-skewed channel, this branding was later dropped.

TVNZ Duke offers a schedule of programmes which include comedy, drama, documentaries, movies, music (under the DUKEbox Music banner) and sport. It initially broadcast between the hours of 6pm and midnight, and occasionally screened live sport events outside these hours; On average, it currently broadcasts from 10.30am until late on weekdays and from 7am until late on weekends. The channel is available on Freeview channel 6 and channel 23 on Sky. Some programmes are also available on the streaming service TVNZ+.

TVNZ Duke started broadcasting in 1080i HD on terrestrially channel 13 on 11 January 2018; the online live stream of the channel had already been streaming up to 720p.

Programming

Local series 

The Moment
Banter
NZ Hunter Adventures
Misadventures
Wild Kai Legends
Short & Wide
Quizmas
The Inside Word
Dog Squad
Motorway Patrol
Spiky Gold Hunters
Southern Pro Wrestling
Late Night Big Breakfast

Sports rights
Formula E (Live and Weekly Highlights Shows)

Licensed from Sky Sport :

AFL Aussie Rules Football (Live, Delayed and Highlights)

Licensed from Spark Sport :

Wimbledon Tennis Championships (Live, Highlights, Match of the Day)
Heineken Champions Cup (Two matches per week in weekend morning)
World Rally Championship (Live and Replays)
FIH 
2022 Women's and 2023 Men's World Cups
Men's and Women's Hockey Pro Leagues (Live coverage for NZ matches only)
Cricket
Men's Super Smash
Women's Super Smash

TVNZ Duke+1

TVNZ Duke+1 is a one-hour timeshifted channel that was launched on Freeview on 17 November 2020. TVNZ Duke+1 is available on Channel 12 on Freeview via UHF and Sky channel 504.

References

External links

TVNZ
Television channels in New Zealand
English-language television stations in New Zealand